Mu hemoglobin is a predicted protein encoded in the HBM  gene. The mRNA is expressed at moderate levels, but the protein has not been detected by mass spectrometry. The order of genes is: 5' - zeta - pseudozeta - mu - pseudoalpha-1 - alpha-2 - alpha-1 - theta1 - 3'.

References

Hemoglobins